Glubbslyme is a fantasy novel by the children's author Jacqueline Wilson.

Plot summary
A girl called Rebecca has just had a row with her best friend, Sarah, because of Mandy, who is pretty, girly type, who can sometimes be quite nasty and rude to Rebecca. Both Rebecca and Mandy thinks that Sarah is their best friend. One day, the girls discover a pond. Rebecca spins a tale, saying that it is a witch's pond in which a witch drowned. Sarah seems to be impressed. Then Mandy, trying to get Sarah's attention, says that the pond wasn't deep enough. Sarah seems to think the same thing. Rebecca goes in the pond to prove it, but Sarah leaves, saying that Rebecca is a baby. While she is in the pond a toad grips at her foot. Rebecca finds out that the toad is Glubbslyme, who is the witch's familiar and has magical powers. Together they seek revenge on Mr. Baker, a man who is fed up of Rebecca because she always ruins her flower beds. They also seek revenge on Mandy. In the end Rebecca and Sarah become friends again.

Illustrations
Nick Sharratt (Wilson's normal illustrator) only in fact does the cover illustration. Jane Cope does the book illustrations.

References

External links
 Author's web site 

1987 British novels
Children's fantasy novels
British children's novels
Novels by Jacqueline Wilson
1987 children's books
Oxford University Press books